TPU or tpu may refer to:

Science and technology
 Tensor Processing Unit, a custom ASIC built by Google, tailored for their TensorFlow platform
 DEC Text Processing Utility, a language developed by Digital Equipment Corporation for developing text editors
 Thermoplastic polyurethane, a class of polyurethane plastics

Other uses
 TACA Peru (ICAO code), an airline
 Tampuan language (ISO 639-3 language code)
 Tikapur Airport (IATA code), Nepal
 Tokyo Polytechnic University, Japan
 Tomsk Polytechnic University, Tomsk, Russia
 Troop Program Unit, an organizational component of the United States Army Reserve